Reina Gabriela Villafañe Bonta (born April 17, 1999) is a professional footballer and filmmaker who plays as a center-back for Brazilian Série A1 club Santos FC. Born in the United States, she represents the Philippines women's national team.

Career

College career
Like her dad, Bonta played collegiate soccer at Yale University.

Club career

Santos
On March 1, 2023, it was announced that Bonta joined  Campeonato Brasileiro de Futebol Feminino club Santos.

International career
Born in the United States, Bonta is eligible to represent either United States, Philippines or Puerto Rico at the international level.

Philippines
In September 2022, Bonta received a call-up from the Philippines for a friendly against New Zealand. The match ended in a 2–1 defeat for the Philippines, Bonta remained on the bench for the entirety of the match. A month later, she was once again called-up for a training camp in Costa Rica. She made her debut for the Philippines in a 1–1 draw against Costa Rica, coming in as a substitute replacing Jessika Cowart on the 85th minute of the match.

Personal life
Bonta belongs to a family of politicians. Her father Rob, currently serves as the attorney general of California while her mother Mia currently serves as a member of the California State Assembly.

References

External links
 

1999 births
Living people
American sportspeople of Filipino descent
American sportspeople of Puerto Rican descent
People of Afro–Puerto Rican descent
Citizens of the Philippines through descent
Filipino people of American descent
Sportspeople of American descent
Filipino people of Puerto Rican descent
Sportspeople of Puerto Rican descent
American women's soccer players
Filipino women's footballers
Philippines women's international footballers
Women's association football defenders
Yale Bulldogs women's soccer players
Yale University alumni
African-American women's soccer players
De Anza Force women's players
Santos FC (women) players